The mean sojourn time (or sometimes mean waiting time) for an object in a system is the amount of time an object is expected to spend in a system before leaving the system for good.

Calculation 

Imagine you are standing in line to buy a ticket at the counter. If you, after one minute, observe the number of customers that are behind you it might be looked upon as a (rough) estimate of the number of customers entering the system (here, waiting line) per unit time (here, minute). If you then divide the number of customers in front of you with this ”flow” of customers you just estimated the waiting time you should expect; i.e. the time it will take you to reach the counter, and indeed it is a rough estimate.

To formalize this somewhat consider the waiting line as a system S into which there is a flow of particles (customers) and where the process “buy ticket” means that the particle leaves the system. The waiting time we have considered above is commonly referred to as transit time, and the theorem we have applied is occasionally called the Little's theorem, which could be formulated as: the expected steady state number of particles in the system S equals the flow of particles into S times the mean transit time. Similar theorems have been discovered in other fields, and in physiology it was earlier known as one of the Stewart-Hamilton equations (e.g. used for estimation of blood volume of organs).

This principle (or, theorem) can be generalized. Thus, consider a system S in the form of a closed domain of finite volume in the Euclidean space. And let us further consider the situation where there is a stream of ”equivalent” particles into S (number of particles per time unit) where each particle retains its identity while being in S and eventually - after a finite time - leaves the system irreversibly (i.e. for these particles the system is ”open”). The Figure

depicts the thought motion history of a single such particle, which thus moves in and out of the subsystem s three times, each of which results in a transit time, namely the time spent in the subsystem between entrance and exit. The sum of these transit times is the sojourn time of s for that particular particle. If the motions of the particles are looked upon as realizations of one and the same stochastic process it is meaningful to speak of the mean value of this sojourn time. That is, the mean sojourn time of a subsystem is the total time a particle is expected to spend in the subsystem s before leaving the system S for good.

To see a practical significance of this quantity let us accept as a law of physics that, if the stream of particles into S is constant and all other relevant factors are kept constant, S will eventually reach steady state (i.e. the number and distribution of particles is constant everywhere in S). It can then be demonstrated that the steady state number of particles in the subsystem s equals the stream of particles into the system S times the mean sojourn time of the subsystem. This is thus a more general form of what above was referred to as Little's theorem, and it might be called the mass-time equivalence:

(expected steady state amount in s) = (stream into S) (mean sojourn time of s)

which sometimes has been called the occupancy principle (what here is called mean sojourn time is then referred to as occupancy; a perhaps not all that fortunate term, because it suggests the presence of a definite number of “sites” in the system S). This mass-time equivalence has found applications in, say, medicine for the study of metabolism of individual organs.

Again, we deal here with a generalization of what in queuing theory is sometimes referred to as Little's theorem that, and this is important, applies only to the whole system S  (not to an arbitrary subsystem as in the mass-time equivalence); the mean sojourn time can in the Little's theorem be interpreted as mean transit time.

As should be evident from the discussion of the figure above, there is a fundamental difference between the meaning of the two quantities sojourn time and transit time: the generality of the mass-time equivalence is very much due to the special meaning of the notion of sojourn time. When the whole system is considered (as in Littl's theorem) is it true that sojourn time always equals transit time.

See also 
 Ergodic theory
 Queueing theory
 Mean free path

References 
Bergner, DMP--A kinetics of macroscopic particles in open heterogeneous systems

Statistical mechanics